The March of the Preobrazhensky Life-Guard Regiment is one of the most famous Russian military marches.  The Preobrazhensky Life-Guard Regiment was one of the oldest and most elite guard regiments of the Imperial Russian Army.

Usage history

Russian Empire
The march was used as an unofficial national anthem in early imperial times.

Modern Russia
March of the Preobrazhensky Regiment was often used in modern Russia, particularly in the annual Victory Day Parade for the trooping of the colours (Flag of Russia and Banner of Victory), notably at the 2005 Victory Day Parade. However as of 2010 The Sacred War has been played instead, for only the trooping of flags 

It is not believed to have been officially used in the Soviet Union much, but it was played by Soviet military bands in concerts and, infrequently, during the inspection segment of parades.

Other uses
Before World War I, the work was used as the presentation march in several military formations in Prussia. Since 1964, it has been used as the slow march of the Royal Marines in the arrangement of Francis Vivian Dunn.
It was used in 1969 to the opening credits of The Life and Times of Lord Mountbatten.

Origin
Neither composer nor date of its writing are known. Judging from an old title of the march, "March of the Peter the Great", some conjecture that it was written in the time of Peter the Great. Some European scholars suggested Swedish authorship, but there is no evidence to that. In German sources the name of Ferdinand Haase (1788—1851) is mentioned. Haase indeed worked in Russia in the 19th century, and he wrote the second Marsch des Leib-Garde Preobraschenski Regiments.  Some English sources, when referring to the arrangement of the march for the Royal Marines, erroneously give the name of the composer as Donajowsky. Vivian Dunn, and early 20th Century British copies of the march, mistakenly attributed it to an Ernest Donajowski, who was in fact in the sheet music publishing business, and was not a composer.

Several lyrics are known for the march.

References

Russian Imperial Guard
Russian military marches